The Diocese of Xochimilco (Latin: Dioecesis Xochimilcensis) is a Latin Church ecclesiastical territory or diocese of the Catholic Church in Mexico.

History 
It was established on 28 September 2019 with its territory having been  carved from the Archdiocese of Mexico. The diocese is a suffragan in the ecclesiastical province of the metropolitan Archdiocese of Mexico and covers 40 parishes with 655,000 Catholics.

Ordinaries 
 Andrés Vargas Peña: (28 Sep 2019 Appointed - present)

References 

Xochimilco
Christian organizations established in 2019
Xochimilco
Xochimilco, Roman Catholic Diocese of